Nethergate Brewery was established in 1986 in Clare, Suffolk, England by former Head Brewer Ian Hornsey and his business partner Dick Burge. In 2005 the brewery site was moved across the county border to Pentlow in Essex. In 2010 the brewery was sold to anonymous buyers. Since 2017 the brewery has been based back in Suffolk, in the hamlet of Rodbridge.

Brewing History
The brewery originally concentrated on cask ale and for a while only brewed Best Bitter, based on traditional recipes for the Yorkshire bitter style. Over the next four years this beer was joined by two other brews; firstly the Old Growler Porter, and then the IPA (in this case, IPA is also claimed to stand for "Ian's Personal Ale", in honour of the Head Brewer). Nethergate's interest in traditional ingredients also saw the creation of two of their most distinctive beers - Umbel Ale, and the stronger Umbel Magna - through the use of a traditional ingredient which had been ignored by brewers for many years: coriander. Nethergate then ventured in the bottled beer market, with Old Growler and Umbel ale being sold in the more specialist off licences and Tesco stores in the south east. 

In October 2010, Burge retired and the brewery was sold to a consortium including ex-Adnams employees Rob Flanagan, Mark Holmes and Mike Atkinson. Nethergate continued its positive growth, winning the Good Pub Guide 'Brewery of the Year' title in 2011 and in 2012 underwent a rebranding exercise which emphasised the brewery's new location across the county border and promoted the 'Growler Brewery' name on pump clips and bottle labels. As part of this exercise two of the brewery's regular beers, Suffolk County Best Bitter and Augustinian Ale, were discontinued from the core range. 

On 18 March 2014 the brewery went into administration and consortium led by founder Dick Burge purchased the  brewery in April 2014. Brewing resumed under the 'Nethergate Brewery' name and a primary focus on selling beer to local free houses.

Notable Beers

Nethergate's core range currently consists of three beers:

Venture - 3.7% English Session
Old Growler - 5.0% English porter
Stour Valley Gold - 4.2% Hoppy Golden
Suffolk County - 4.0% Traditional Best Bitter  

The brewery also produce a number of seasonal beers including:

Umbel Ale - 3.8% Coriander beer
Umbel Magna - 5.0% Porter brewed with coriander
Lemon Head - 4.0% Golden Ale brewed with lemon and ginger
Augustinian - 4.5% Best Bitter
Essex Border - 4.8% Blonde Ale
Melford Mild - 3.7% Mild Ale

The Brewery also has a sub brand which beer is available in cans. Growling Dog 
Tropical Ipa - 7.5% IPA 
Milk Stout - 6.5% Stout

Awards
Nethergate have had notable success in the 'Speciality' category of CAMRA's Champion Beer of Britain awards, with Umbel Magna winning the category three times (2007, 2009, 2013) and Umbel Ale winning  in 2000

References

External links
Official Site
Cambridge CAMRA Brewery Profile

Breweries in England
1986 establishments in England
British companies established in 1986
Food and drink companies established in 1986